Gavrilo Pajović (born July 3, 1971) is a Montenegrin professional basketball executive and former player. He is currently serving as the sports director for Budućnost VOLI of the Adriatic League and the Montenegrin League.

Playing career 
Pajović spent the most of his professional career with his hometown team Budućnost. He had three stints there. During his second stint (1993–2000), Pajović won two Yugoslav Championships and two Yugoslav Cups. Also, he played for Belgrade powerhouse Partizan in the 1992–93 season and for Primorka Bar in the 2001–02 season.

Pajović spent two seasons in Bosnia and Herzegovina. He played for Bosna in the 1991–92 season, and for Igokea in the 2000–01 season. During  his stint with Igokea he won the Bosnia and Herzegovina Championship.

In 2008, Pajović finished his playing career with Mediteran Herceg Novi.

National team career 
Pajović was a member of the Yugoslavia Juniors team what played at the 1991 FIBA Under-19 World Championship in Edmonton, Canada. Over eight tournament games, he averaged 2.2 points per game.

Post-playing career 
After retirement in 2008, Pajović joined the non-playing staff of Budućnost where he became a sports director.

Personali life 
His son, Feđa (born 2001) is a basketball player, who played for Studentski centar and Metalac Valjevo.

References

External links
Gavrilo Pajovic at eurobasket.com
Player Profile at basketball-reference.com
Player Profile at euroleague.net
Player Profile at basketnews.lt
Player Profile at proballers.com

1971 births
Living people
ABA League players
KK Bosna Royal players
KK Budućnost players
KK Igokea players
KK Partizan players
Montenegrin expatriate basketball people in Serbia
Montenegrin men's basketball players
Point guards
Sportspeople from Podgorica